Lincoln Airport may refer to:

 Lincoln Airport (Montana) in Lincoln, Montana, United States (FAA: S69)
 Lincoln Airport (Nebraska) in Lincoln, Nebraska, United States (FAA: LNK)
 Abraham Lincoln Capital Airport in Springfield, Illinois

See also
 Lincoln Regional Airport (disambiguation)
 Lincoln Municipal Airport (disambiguation)
 Lincoln County Airport (disambiguation)